Canada competed at the 1960 Winter Olympics in Squaw Valley, United States. Canada has competed at every Winter Olympic Games.

Medalists

Alpine skiing

Men

Women

Cross-country skiing

Men

Figure skating

Men

Women

Pairs

Ice hockey

Canada was represented by the Kitchener-Waterloo Dutchmen, which also represented Canada at the 1956 Winter Olympics (bronze medal).  The Dutchmen are the only self-contained club team to represent Canada at two different Olympics.

Group A 
Top two teams (shaded ones) from each group advanced to the final round and played for 1st-6th places, other teams played in the consolation round.

Canada 5-2 Sweden
Canada 19-1 Japan

Final round 

Canada 12-0 Germany (UTG)
Canada 4-0 Czechoslovakia
USA 2-1 Canada
Canada 6-5 Sweden
Canada 8-5 USSR

Leading scorers

Nordic combined 

Events:
 normal hill ski jumping (Three jumps, best two counted and shown here.)
 15 km cross-country skiing

Ski jumping

Speed skating

Men

Women

Official Outfitter
HBC was the official outfitter of clothing for members of the Canadian Olympic team.

References

 Olympic Winter Games 1960, full results by sports-reference.com

Nations at the 1960 Winter Olympics
1960
Winter Olympics